The 2019 Mpumalanga provincial election was held on 8 May 2019 to elect the 30 members of the Mpumalanga Provincial Legislature. It was held on the same day as the 2019 South African general election. The election was won by the African National Congress, the incumbent governing party in the province.

Incumbent Premier Refilwe Mtsweni-Tsipane of the African National Congress was elected to her first full term after the election.

Premier candidates
Prior to the election, the incumbent governing party in the province, the African National Congress (ANC), did not announce a premier candidate. Incumbent premier Refilwe Mtsweni-Tsipane was first on the party's provincial candidate list for the election. She was announced as the party's premier candidate following the election.

Democratic Alliance (DA) provincial leader and member of the provincial legislature Jane Sithole was announced as the DA's premier candidate. She was also first on the party's list.

The Economic Freedom Fighters (EFF) did not field a premier candidate since the party seeks to abolish provincial governments. EFF provincial chair Collen Sedibe was first on the party's provincial candidate list.

The Freedom Front Plus nominated its provincial leader Werner Weber as its premier candidate.

Results

References

2019 elections in South Africa